"Time’s Arrow" is the 26th episode of the fifth season and the first episode of the sixth season of the American science fiction television series Star Trek: The Next Generation, it comprises the 126th and 127th episodes overall. A two-part episode of Star Trek: TNG, the first episode was a cliffhanger season finale for the fifth season and the second episode was the premiere for the sixth season.

Set in the 24th century, the series follows the adventures of the Starfleet crew of the Federation starship Enterprise-D.
In this episode, an engineering team finds evidence that aliens visited Earth in 19th century San Francisco: Data's severed head, buried five hundred years ago.

The second part of the episode was nominated for three Creative Arts Emmy Awards, winning two: Outstanding Individual Achievement in Costume Design for a Series, and Outstanding Individual Achievement in Hairstyling for a Series.

Plot

Part I
The Enterprise is recalled to Earth on a priority mission regarding evidence of aliens on the planet 500 years before. They are shown a cavern near Starfleet Headquarters in San Francisco containing 19th century relics, and the disembodied head of Data. Investigation reveals cellular fossils native to the planet of Devidia II, indicating a race of shapeshifters were visiting Earth's past. The Enterprise leaves for the planet, taking Data's second head. Upon arrival they discover a temporal disturbance on the planet. Though no life forms are visible, Deanna Troi senses the presence of suffering humans. The crew determine that the aliens are slightly out of phase with time. Data notes that his android body has a phase discriminator that would allow him to see the aliens. Captain Picard reluctantly allows him to join the away team. Data establishes a means of communicating what he sees to the rest of the crew. Once in phase with the aliens, Data describes them as absorbing strands of light from a device in the center of the cavern, appearing otherwise benign. He describes two aliens entering a time portal, that he is drawn into. Data finds himself on Earth in San Francisco on August 11, 1893.

Data realizes he needs money to accomplish his goals. He wins a sizable amount beating card sharks at their own game in poker. Data takes up residence in a local hotel, befriending the bellhop (future author Jack London). Data claims to be a French inventor. He enlists London to acquire 19th century supplies under the pretense of building an automobile engine, when in fact Data is building a detector to find the aliens. Data sees a photo of Guinan, the bartender from the Enterprise, in a newspaper. He goes to a reception she will be attending, believing she also came back in time from the future. Data interrupts her speaking with Samuel Clemens (Mark Twain), speaking to her as if she is from the 24th century, which sparks Clemens' curiosity. Speaking privately, it becomes clear to Data that Guinan is native to 1893 and has yet to meet the Enterprise crew. Clemens is discovered eavesdropping on this conversation, and he becomes determined to discover the truth behind Data and Guinan.

Meanwhile in the 24th century, the Enterprise crew has determined how to build a similar phase discriminator to Data's. This will allow them to see the aliens, and go back in time to rescue Data. Guinan convinces Picard to join the pending away mission, warning that otherwise Picard and Guinan will have never met at all. The away team activates the phase discriminator and see the aliens as Data described. The strands of light are human life forces, taken at the moment of death. The away team uses the time portal to travel back to the past to put a stop to the aliens.

Part II
The away team is in 1893, investigating the current cholera outbreak. They determine that the alien shapeshifters are taking advantage of the epidemic to mask their draining of life-force from 19th century humans. While investigating at a hospital, they encounter two shapeshifters. When confronted, the aliens escape, which alerts Data to their location and reunites him with the team. They use Data's device to follow the aliens to the same cavern near San Francisco. They are followed by Guinan and Clemens. The aliens' cane-like device is used to open a time portal back to future Devidia II. In a struggle over the device, Data's head is detached from his body and left in 1893. The away team follows one alien into the future, bringing Data's body and the cane device. Clemens follows the others into the future, while Picard remains in 1893, tending to an injured Guinan. Picard learns from the remaining shapeshifter that 19th century Earth would be in jeopardy if the aliens' habitat in the 24th century is attacked, due to amplifying the time shift effect. Picard uses iron filings to place a binary message in Data's static memory, to warn his crew in the future.

In the 24th century, Geordi La Forge reattaches Data's 500-year-old head onto his body. Once conscious, Data discovers Picard's message and they engineer a solution. They determine that using photon torpedoes in phase with the alien habitat will negate the dangerous time shift amplification. Riker decides to rescue Picard. After studying the portal-opening device, it is determined that only one person would be able to travel to the 19th century to exchange places with Picard. Riker allows Clemens to return to his native time. Clemens meets Picard in the 1893 cavern. Picard thanks him for agreeing to take care of Guinan's injuries and settle their 19th century affairs, and he laments not having the opportunity to know Clemens. The author replies that his personality is written into his books. Picard returns to the future, and is transported to safety as the Enterprise fires the time-phased torpedoes, which destroys the alien habitat.

Reception

Critical response
In 2013, Slate ranked "Time's Arrow" one of the ten best episodes in the Star Trek franchise.

Writing for The Deseret News, television editor Scott D. Pierce found the first part of the story "fresh and intriguing". Wired asked readers to select which episodes of the series were their favorites, and "Time's Arrow" was highlighted in their resultant article.

Variety listed "Time's Arrow" (Parts I & II) as one of the top 15 episodes of Star Trek: The Next Generation in 2017.

In 2016, the "Time's Arrow" two-part episode was ranked by SyFy Wire as the 9th best Star Trek franchise episode involving time travel. Mark Twain (Samuel Clemens) was ranked as one of the top seven time travelers of the franchise by Nerdist in 2019. They note that when he is taken to the future, he is glad there is no poverty, war, or prejudices.

In 2016, Empire ranked this the 32nd best out of the top 50 episodes of all the 700 plus Star Trek television episodes.

In 2018, CBR ranked this one of the top-twenty time travel themed episodes of all Star Trek series.

In 2020, SyFy Wire noted in this episode the relationship between Picard and Data, in particular showing that Picard is reluctant to risk what they call his "robot bestie". They point out the episode begins with the shocking discovery of Data's head on Earth, which causes a certain concern among the crew that Data will die on ancient Earth somehow, leaving his severed head to be discovered in the 24th century.

Awards
The second part of the episode was nominated for three Creative Arts Emmy Awards, winning two:

Scientific response
In his book Time Travel (2012), author David Wittenberg wrote favorably of the depiction of the logic of time travel in the episode: "Star Trek's 'Time's Arrow' is both cognizant and respectful of … physical theory, offering a time travel loop in which causal order is not upset, or, in other words, in which no strictly logical paradoxes ensue."

Release
"Time's Arrow, Part I" and "Time's Arrow, Part II" was released on LaserDisc on the United Kingdom in November 1996. The PAL format optical disc had a runtime of 88 minutes using both sides of the disc, to includes both Parts (CLV). The 12 inch optical disc retails for 19.99 pounds when it came out.

"Times Arrow, Part I" was released in the United States on November 5, 2002, as part of the season five DVD box set. The Blu-ray release for Part I in the United States on November 18, 2013, followed by the United Kingdom the next day, November 19, 2013.
Star Trek The Next Generation DVD set, volume 5, disc 7, selection 2.
 Star Trek The Next Generation DVD set, volume 6, disc 1, selection 1

See also

 Roswell That Ends Well
 The City on the Edge of Forever
 Little Green Men (Star Trek: Deep Space Nine)

References

External links

 
 

Star Trek: The Next Generation (season 5) episodes
Star Trek: The Next Generation (season 6) episodes
1992 American television episodes
Cultural depictions of Mark Twain
Star Trek time travel episodes
Fiction set in 1893
Television episodes set in San Francisco
Emmy Award-winning episodes
Star Trek: The Next Generation episodes in multiple parts
Television episodes directed by Les Landau